The ambassador of the United States to Algeria is the official representative of the president of the United States to the head of state of Algeria.

Until 1962, Algeria had been under the dominion of France. Independence from France was formally declared on July 3, 1962. The United States and France both formally recognized Algeria on that same day. The Ottoman government had recognized the United States in 1795, but formal diplomatic relations had not been established.

The U.S. has had consular representation in Algeria intermittently since 1796. On September 29, 1962, diplomatic relations between Algeria and the United States were formally established when the U.S. Consulate General in Algiers was raised to embassy status. William J. Porter was appointed as the first chargé d'affaires ad interim pending appointment of an ambassador to Algiers. He was promoted to ambassador on November 29, 1962.

Algeria severed diplomatic relations with the United States on June 6, 1967, in the wake of the June 1967 Arab-Israeli War. A U.S. Interests Section was established in the Swiss Embassy. The United States and Algeria reestablished diplomatic relations, and their respective embassies in Algiers and Washington reopened on November 12, 1974.

Ambassadors and chiefs of mission

See also
Algeria – United States relations
Foreign relations of Algeria
Ambassadors of the United States

Notes

References

United States Department of State: Background notes on Algeria

External links
 United States Department of State: Chiefs of Mission for Algeria
 United States Department of State: Algeria
 United States Embassy in Algiers

United States Ambassadors
Algeria
Main